The 1905 Illinois Fighting Illini football team was an American football team that represented the University of Illinois during the 1905 Western Conference football season.  In their second season under head coach Fred Lowenthal, the Illini compiled a 5–4 record and finished in last place in the Western Conference. Tackle/halfback C. J. Moynihan was the team captain.

Schedule

References

Illinois
Illinois Fighting Illini football seasons
Illinois Fighting Illini football